Neothais marginatra, common name : the brownish drupe, is a species of sea snail, a marine gastropod mollusk in the family Muricidae, the murex snails or rock snails.

Description
The shell size varies between 20 mm and 45 mm

Distribution
This marine species occurs in the Indian Ocean off Aldabra, the Mascarene Basin, the coast of South Africa and Mozambique; in the Pacific Ocean off Hawaii , the Fiji Islands, Samoan Islands and Polynesia; off Australia (Northern Territory, Queensland, Western Australia).

References

 Küster, H.C. 1862. Die Gattung Ricinula. 1–24, pls 1–5 in Kobelt, W. & Küster, H.C. (eds.). Systematisches Conchylien-Cabinet. Nürnberg : Bauer & Raspe.
 Melvill, J.C. 1901. A few further remarks upon the Erythraen molluscan fauna, with descriptions of seven species of Aden, in the collection of Commander E.R. Shopland, RIM. Annals and Magazine of Natural History 7 42: 550–556
 Taylor, J.D. (1971). Intertidal Zonation at Aldabra Atoll. Phil. Trns. Roy. Soc. Lond. B. 260, 173–213
 Taylor, J.D. (1973). Provisional list of the mollusca of Aldabra Atoll
 MacNae, W. & M. Kalk (eds) (1958). A natural history of Inhaca Island, Mozambique. Witwatersrand Univ. Press, Johannesburg. I-iv, 163 pp
 Drivas, J. & M. Jay (1988). Coquillages de La Réunion et de l'île Maurice
 Tan, K.S. 1995. Taxonomy of Thais and Morula (Mollusca: Gastropoda: Muricidae) in Singapore and Vicinity. 546 pp. 
 Tan, K.S. & Chou, L.M. 2000. A Guide to Common Seashells of Singapore. Singapore : Singapore Science Centre 168 pp.
Claremont M., Vermeij G.J., Williams S.T. & Reid D.G. (2013) Global phylogeny and new classification of the Rapaninae (Gastropoda: Muricidae), dominant molluscan predators on tropical rocky seashores. Molecular Phylogenetics and Evolution 66: 91–102

External links
 

Muricidae
Gastropods described in 1832